In philosophy and science, a first principle is a basic proposition or assumption that cannot be deduced from any other proposition or assumption. First principles in philosophy are from first cause attitudes and taught by Aristotelians, and nuanced versions of first principles are referred to as postulates by Kantians.

In mathematics, first principles are referred to as axioms or postulates. In physics and other sciences, theoretical work is said to be from first principles, or ab initio, if it starts directly at the level of established science and does not make assumptions such as empirical model and parameter fitting. "First principles thinking" consists of deriving things to their fundamental proven axioms in the given arena, before reasoning up by asking which ones are relevant to the question at hand, then cross referencing conclusions based on chosen axioms and making sure conclusions do not violate any fundamental laws. Physicists include counterintuitive concepts with reiteration.

In formal logic
In a formal logical system, that is, a set of propositions that are consistent with one another, it is possible that some of the statements can be deduced from other statements. For example, in the syllogism, "All men are mortal; Socrates is a man; Socrates is mortal" the last claim can be deduced from the first two.

A first principle is an axiom that cannot be deduced from any other within that system. The classic example is that of Euclid's Elements; its hundreds of geometric propositions can be deduced from a set of definitions, postulates, and common notions: all three types constitute first principles.

Philosophy
In philosophy "first principles" are from first cause attitudes commonly referred to as a priori terms and arguments, which are contrasted to a posteriori terms, reasoning or arguments, in that the former is simply assumed and exist prior to the reasoning process and the latter are deduced or inferred after the initial reasoning process. First principles are generally treated in the realm of philosophy known as epistemology, but are an important factor in any metaphysical speculation.

In philosophy "first principles" are often somewhat synonymous with a priori, datum and axiomatic reasoning.

Aristotle
Terence Irwin writes:

Descartes
Profoundly influenced by Euclid, Descartes was a rationalist who invented the foundationalist system of philosophy. He used the method of doubt, now called Cartesian doubt, to systematically doubt everything he could possibly doubt until he was left with what he saw as purely indubitable truths. Using these self-evident propositions as his axioms, or foundations, he went on to deduce his entire body of knowledge from them. The foundations are also called a priori truths. His most famous proposition is "Je pense, donc je suis" (I think, therefore I am, or Cogito ergo sum), which he indicated in his Discourse on the Method was "the first principle of the philosophy of which I was in search."

Descartes describes the concept of a first principle in the following excerpt from the preface to the Principles of Philosophy (1644):

In physics
In physics, a calculation is said to be from first principles, or ab initio, if it starts directly at the level of established laws of physics and does not make assumptions such as empirical model and fitting parameters.

For example, calculation of electronic structure using Schrödinger's equation within a set of approximations that do not include fitting the model to experimental data is an ab initio approach.

See also
 Abstraction
 Brute fact
 Law of thought
 Present
 Clean room implementation
 Primitive notion

References

Further reading
Orestes J. Gonzalez, Actus Essendi and the Habit of the First Principle in Thomas Aquinas (New York: Einsiedler Press, 2019).

Abstraction
Principles
Foundationalism
Formal systems